A Kiss Before You Go is the second studio album by Norwegian band Katzenjammer. It was released on September 9, 2011 by Propeller Recordings.

Reception

Critical reception

A Kiss Before You Go received generally positive reviews from music critics. At Metacritic, which assigns a normalised rating out of 100 to reviews from mainstream critics, the album received an average score of 66, based on four reviews, which indicates "generally favorable reviews". Jon O'Brien of Allmusic wrote "it's difficult not to be enamored by [the album's] inventiveness and inherent avant-garde charm." BBC Music's Mischa Pearlman called the album "peculiar and unconventional" because it "constantly shape-shifts and surprises, but does so with a graceful, effortless ease that feels incredibly natural and utterly delightful". In a review for The Independent, Hugh Montgomery said its "oompah brass [and] jaunty jigs" were "best in small doses." He also described A Kiss Before You Go as "exhilarating and nauseous". MusicOHM reviewer Ben Weisz wrote that Katzenjammer's "latest effort is often raucous, occasionally majestic and close to brilliance."

Chart performance
In Norway, A Kiss Before You Go debuted at number eight on the albums chart. The following week it reached its peak position of number six. The album reached number seven in Germany, where it sold 100,000 copies and was certified gold.

A Kiss Before You Go debuted at number thirty-three in Switzerland. It remained on the chart for three weeks. The album also charted in the top fifty in Austria and the Netherlands. In Belgium, it peaked at number one hundred and thirty-one.

Track listing
Songs written and composed by Mats Rybø, except where noted.

Personnel
Credits adapted from A Kiss Before You Go liner notes.

Anne Marit Bergheim – instruments, vocals
Mathias Fossum – photography
Mike Hartung – arrangement, production , recording
Solveig Heilo – arrangement, instruments, vocals
Heydays – design
Daniel Herskedal – sousaphone
Hans Andreas Horntveth – recording assistant
Turid Jørgensen – arrangement, instruments, vocals
Gunnhild Mathea Olaussen – violin
Mr. Orkester – percussion
Chris Sansom – mastering
Marianne Sveen – arrangement, instruments, vocals
Kåre Chr. Vestrheim – arrangement, instruments, production, recording
Dweezil Zappa – electric guitar

Charts

Release history

References

2011 albums
Katzenjammer (band) albums
Pop rock albums by Norwegian artists